The 1925 Ice Hockey European Championship was the 10th edition of the ice hockey tournament for European countries associated to the International Ice Hockey Federation.  
 
The tournament was played between January 8, and January 11, 1925, in Štrbské Pleso and Starý Smokovec, Czechoslovakia, and it was won by Czechoslovakia.

Results

January 8

January 9

January 11

Final standings

Top Goalscorer

Josef Maleček (Czechoslovakia), 5 goals

References
 Euro Championship 1925
 Dates

1925
Ice Hockey European Championships
1924–25 in Czechoslovak ice hockey
January 1925 sports events
Sport in Prešov Region